The 1844 United States presidential election in New Jersey took place between November 1 and December 4, 1844, as part of the 1844 United States presidential election. Voters chose seven representatives, or electors to the Electoral College, who voted for President and Vice President.

New Jersey voted for the Whig candidate, Henry Clay, over Democratic candidate James K. Polk. Clay won New Jersey by a margin of 1.09 percent; however, Polk would be the last Democrat to carry Cape May County until Woodrow Wilson in 1912. This is the last time a Democrat won without carrying Hudson County.

Results

See also
 United States presidential elections in New Jersey

References

New Jersey
1844
1844 New Jersey elections